The Jacob H. Barr House is a historic home in Mansfield, Ohio. It was the city residence of farm owner Jacob Harrison Barr. It is listed on the National Register of Historic Places. It was built  in a Queen Anne architecture style.

References

National Register of Historic Places in Richland County, Ohio
Buildings and structures completed in 1890
1890s establishments in Ohio
Houses in Richland County, Ohio
Buildings and structures in Mansfield, Ohio
Queen Anne architecture in Ohio